Jeremiah Kamele is a Mosotho footballer who plays as a defender for Lioli FC.

References

Year of birth missing (living people)
Living people
Lesotho footballers
Lesotho international footballers
Association football defenders